The 1988–89 IHF Women's Cup Winners' Cup was the thirteenth edition of IHF's competition for European women's handball national cup champions.

1986 European Cup runner-up Ştiinţa Bacău defeated defending champion Kuban Krasnodar in the final, becoming the first Romanian team to win the competition.

Results

References

Women's EHF Cup Winners' Cup
1988 in handball
1989 in handball